2-Cyanoguanidine is a nitrile derived from guanidine. It is a dimer of cyanamide, from which it can be prepared. 2-Cyanoguanidine is a colourless solid that is soluble in water, acetone, and alcohol, but not nonpolar organic solvents.

Production and use
2-Cyanoguanidine is produced by treating cyanamide with base. It is produced in soil by decomposition of cyanamide. A variety of useful compounds are produced from 2-cyanoguanidine, guanidines and melamine.  For example, acetoguanamine and benzoguanamine are prepared by condensation of cyanoguanidine with the nitrile:
(H2N)2C=NCN  +  RCN   →  (CNH2)2(CR)N3

Cyanoguanidine is also used as a slow fertilizer. Formerly, it was used as a fuel in some explosives. It is used in the adhesive industry as a curing agent for epoxy resins.

Chemistry

Two tautomeric forms exist, differing in the protonation and bonding of the nitrogen to which the nitrile group is attached.

2-Cyanoguanidine can also exist in a zwitterionic form via a formal acid–base reaction among the nitrogens.

Loss of ammonia (NH3) from the zwitterionic form, followed by deprotonation of the remaining central nitrogen atom, gives the dicyanamide anion, [N(CN)2]−.

References

External links
 
 OECD document 
 Entry at chemicalland21.com

Guanidines
Cyanamides
Cyanoguanidines